Syncosmia trichophora is a moth in the family Geometridae first described by George Hampson in 1895. It is found in India and Nepal.

The wingspan is about 20 mm. Adults are pale green, suffused with pale rufous. The forewings have indistinct blackish basal and antemedial bands with waved edges. The hindwings are whitish with ochreous tufts.

References

Moths described in 1895
Eupitheciini